Mwami Mwezi III Ndagushimiye was the king of Burundi from 1709 to 1739.

Mwami Mwezi III Ndagushimiye
18th-century monarchs in Africa